The Audi Channel was a digital satellite television channel, launched in the UK in 2005 by the German car company Audi.  It was broadcast via Sky Digital, which is generally receivable in the United Kingdom, and the Republic of Ireland (although the Sky Digital output is also receivable in many mainland European countries). It was free-to-air. The Audi Channel was broadcast in the 4:3 aspect ratio, in standard definition.

Programmes
The channel featured a variety of programmes, including "user-guide" information about Audi's vehicles, in-depth model profiles, test drives, celebrity interviews, historic features, new product launches, professional driving tuition, dealership profiles, coverage of sporting events sponsored by Audi, including the "science of sport", and each round of the DTM - the German Touring Car Championship.

Channel closure
The channel closed at midnight on 1 August 2009.

Similar channels
Audi Worldwide also have a web-only stream, called "Audi tv".  It can be found at https://web.archive.org/web/20080507211746/http://tv.audi.com/.

References

External links

Audi
Defunct television channels in the United Kingdom
Television channels and stations established in 2005
Television channels and stations disestablished in 2009